Platylophus trifoliatus is a species of trees in the family Cunoniaceae. It is endemic to South Africa and the only species of the genus Platylophus. Leaves are opposite with three leaflets. Flowers are creamish or yellowish and arranged in axillary thyrsoid inflorescences. Fruits are indehiscent. Its closest relative is the Tasmanian endemic Anodopetalum.

References

Trees of South Africa
Cunoniaceae